Brian Robert Ford (born 10 July 1951) is a former New Zealand rugby union player. A wing, Ford represented Canterbury and Marlborough at a provincial level, and was a member of the New Zealand national side, the All Blacks, from 1977 to 1979. He played 20 matches for the All Blacks including four internationals. In 1988, he was one of the first two "celebrity entries"—alongside Kevin Eveleigh—at the annual Coast to Coast adventure race.

References

1951 births
Living people
People from Kaikōura
People educated at Rangiora High School
New Zealand rugby union players
New Zealand international rugby union players
Canterbury rugby union players
Marlborough rugby union players
Rugby union wings
Rugby union players from Canterbury, New Zealand